is a 2009 Japanese romance drama film based on the popular cell phone novel of the same name. Director Yuri Kanchiku made her directorial debut in this film. Japanese model Nozomi Sasaki stars in her first lead role in a film, as a seventeen-year-old high school student. The film tells the story of a manipulative schoolgirl who mends her ways when she falls for an older professor.

Tenshi no Koi debuted in a special screening at the 22nd Tokyo International Film Festival. It was subsequently released in Japanese cinemas on 7 November 2009. The film grossed a total of US$1,090,202 in four different countries, and it received generally positive reviews from critics.

Plot
Seventeen year old high school student Rio Ozawa is always the center of attention due to her beauty. Yet Rio has never cared about anyone but herself due to her traumatic past. Her friends exist only so she can use them for her gains. Rio is only interested in money. She is involved in "compensated dating" and extortion.

One day Rio's photographs get mixed up at the store with those of another person of last name Ozawa. She then meets 35-year-old college professor Kouki Ozawa, and falls in love for the first time. Rio feels confused by her emotions. She changes from a confident, mature person, to something more like a typical schoolgirl with a huge crush. She follows Kouki around, asks him to tutor her and wants to date him. Although Kouki becomes interested in Rio, there is a reason he does not pursue the relationship. However, Rio is very insistent and starts changing her whole world for the better in order to be with him.

Suddenly Kouki disappears without saying goodbye and Rio is crushed. Her friends, with the help of Kouki's relative, find him working at another school. Rio then finds out that he is dying of brain cancer, which is why he wanted to keep his distance, in order to avoid breaking her heart. She convinces him to get a risky operation, even if it means he cannot remember her, so that they can have more time together. In the end, he survives the operation and they get together again, though it is not clear if he remembers her.

Cast
 Nozomi Sasaki as Rio Ozawa
 Shosuke Tanihara as Kouki Ozawa
 Hikaru Yamamoto as Tomoko
 Mitsuki Oishi as Maki
 Araki Nanaki as Miho
 Saki Kagami as Naoko
 Motoki Fukami as Yuuji
 Wakana Sakai as Kaori Ozawa
 Mitsuru Fukikoshi as Masao
 Mayumi Wakamura as Ayako Ozawa
 Kanji Tsuda as Kazuki

Production
The cell phone novel Tenshi no Koi, which revolves around the topic of female high school students, had 13 million readers in Japan as of July 2009. On 19 July 2009 it was announced to the media that the novel would have a film adaptation and that the main cast members would be popular model Nozomi Sasaki and professional actor Shosuke Tanihara. In her first lead role in a film, Sasaki was cast in the role of Rio, a seventeen-year-old high school student, while Tanihara would be her co-star, playing Rio's 35 year-old professor Kouki. Tanihara had previously starred in films like the 2009 Nodame Cantabile: The Movie, and the film adaptation of the manga Love Com (2006). Filming was done at a university in Yokohama.

Soundtrack
The music in the film Tenshi no Koi was done by indigo blue and Zentaro Watanabe.

Release
Tenshi no Koi made its debut at the 22nd Tokyo International Film Festival on 17 October 2009. There, the film was showcased as one of the festival's special film screenings. It was subsequently released in Japanese cinemas on 7 November 2009. Some theaters banned the original film poster because it showed the lead actress bare-backed from the waist up. Another poster was released that showed both leads about to kiss.

Tenshi no Koi made its first overseas screening in Singapore. There, Tenshi no Koi was released under the English name of My Rainy Days on 8 April 2010 by distributor Cathay-keris Films. In Hong Kong, the film was released under its Chinese name of "出租天使" (pinyin:chūzū tiānshǐ) on 29 July 2010.

Reception

Critical reception
The film received good reviews, particularly for its photography and acting of the lead characters.

Maggie Lee of The Hollywood Reporter said that the film's "love relationship draws on the stuff of Korean TV soaps" but added that it "avoids conventional tearjerking pitfalls with some unexpected narrative turns.". She also praised actress Nozomi Sasaki, saying that her acting value as brings "charismatic, slightly unreachable presence" to the film. She also praised the director's handling of the film, which she says showcases "pubescent sexuality and the mind-sets and mannerisms of the new generation without being patronizing or judgmental.".

Box office
Tenshi no Koi debuted at the 10th position in the Japanese box office on the weekend of 7–8 November 2009, grossing a total of $329,536. It remained in the Japanese box office for one more week, earning it a total gross of $868,360 in Japan. Hong Kong garnered the highest overseas gross, with the film becoming the sixth highest grossing there during its debut week, earning 650,000 yuan. The film grossed a total of US$180,516 over the three weekends it was shown in Hong Kong. It also grossed a total of $36,410 and $2,598 in Singapore and Taiwan box offices respectively. In total, it earned US$1,090,202 world-wide.

References

External links
 
 
 Tenshi no Koi at the Japanese Film Database

2009 films
Japanese romantic drama films
2009 romantic drama films
2000s Japanese films